Bagha or Bagga may refer to:

People
Bagha Jatin (Jatindranath Mukherjee, 1879–1915), Indian freedom fighter
Sahir Ali Bagga (born 1978), Pakistani singer, music director and composer
Simran Bagga (born 1976), Indian film actress

Places
 Bagha Upazila, an administrative region in Bangladesh
 Bagha, Hormozgan, a village in Hormozgan Province, Iran
 Bagha, Razavi Khorasan, a village in Razavi Khorasan Province, Iran

Other uses
 Bagha Mosque, near Rajshahi, Bangladesh
 Bagha Byne, a character in the Goopy – Bagha film series

See also
 Bagh (disambiguation)
 Bagaha, a city and municipality in Bihar, India